Dog Shy is a 1926 two-reel silent comedy film starring Charley Chase. Chase plays a young man with a fear of dogs. After being chased by one, he enters a phone booth and a young lady tells him her trouble: she is being pressured into marrying a wealthy duke against her wishes. He agrees to help her and meet at her home. He is, however, mistaken as a newly hired butler. After a series of hilarious misunderstandings and disasters, Chase is recognized as a hero and enjoys a happy ending.

Cast
 Charley Chase – Charley
 Stuart Holmes – The Duke
 Mildred June – The girl
 Josephine Crowell – The girl's mother
 William Orlamond – The girl's father
 Fred Kelsey – The cop (uncredited)
 Jerry Mandy – The crook's accomplice (uncredited)
 Buddy – Duke the dog (uncredited)

References

External links

Dog Shy  at Another Nice Mess
Dog Shy on YouTube

1926 films
American silent short films
American black-and-white films
1926 short films
Films directed by Leo McCarey
Silent American comedy films
Films with screenplays by H. M. Walker
1926 comedy films
1920s American films